San Juan de Marcona Airport  is an airport serving city of San Juan de Marcona, the capital of the Ica Region of Peru, and the Marcona Naval Base.

See also
Transport in Peru
List of airports in Peru

References

External links
OpenStreetMap - San Juan de Marcona
OurAirports - San Juan de Marcona
SkyVector - San Juan de Marcona

Airports in Peru
Buildings and structures in Arequipa Region